TAAG Flight 462 a Boeing 737-200 took off from Lubango Airport in Lubango, Angola, on a regular domestic service to Quatro de Fevereiro Airport in Luanda on November 8, 1983. The aircraft had 126 passengers and four crew on board.

Aircraft 
The aircraft involved was a one-year-old Boeing 737-2M2 (registration D2-TBN, factory no. 22775, and serial no. 869) that had its maiden flight on April 29, 1982, and was delivered to TAAG Angola Airlines on May 6 the same year. The aircraft was powered by two Pratt & Whitney JT8D-17 turbofan engines.

Crash 
The Boeing 737 was operating as Flight DT 462. The left wingtip hit the ground, and the aircraft broke apart and burst into flames. The wreckage came to rest  from the end of the runway at Lubango Airport. The crash killed all 130 people on board.

Probable cause
UNITA guerillas claimed to have shot down the aircraft, which they believed to be carrying only military personnel, with a surface-to-air missile to protest Angola's government. Post-crash investigation of the aircraft's wreckage by the Angolan authorities reported no conclusive evidence of missile damage, and the cause of the crash is officially considered to be a mechanical failure.

References

Aviation accidents and incidents in 1983
Mass murder in 1983
Aviation accidents and incidents in Angola
Airliner shootdown incidents
Accidents and incidents involving the Boeing 737 Original
Taag Angola Airlines Boeing 737 Crash, 1983
TAAG Angola Airlines accidents and incidents
20th-century aircraft shootdown incidents
November 1983 events in Africa
1983 murders in Africa
Aviation accident investigations with disputed causes
1983 disasters in Angola